Ronald I. Meshbesher (May 18, 1933 – June 13, 2018) was an American lawyer and the founder and president of the Minnesota law firm Meshbesher & Spence.

Early life and career
Upon graduating from the University of Minnesota Law School, Meshbesher began practicing law at the age of 24 in the Hennepin County Attorney's Office as a prosecutor, where he tried 45 felony cases in his first three years with a 92% conviction rate. He founded the law firm of Meshbesher & Spence in 1961. The Minneapolis Star Tribune called him "a dean of the Minnesota criminal-defense bar for 45 years".

In 1992 Mr. Meshbesher wrote the Trial Handbook for Minnesota Lawyers. He also founded or served as president or vice president of numerous legal associations, including the Minnesota Association of Criminal Defense Lawyers, the National Association of Criminal Defense Lawyers (1984–85) and the American Board of Criminal Lawyers.

In popular culture
The Joel and Ethan Coen film A Serious Man shot a scene at Meshbesher's Minneapolis law office and mentions "Ron Meshbesher" as an attorney in the film.

References

External links
Minnesota Law Firm of Meshbesher & Spence
Larry King Live: Were Bill Clinton's Last-Minute Pardons Unpardonable? CNN Transcript

1933 births
2018 deaths
Deaths from Alzheimer's disease
Lawyers from Minneapolis
Writers from Minneapolis
University of Minnesota Law School alumni
20th-century American lawyers
Neurological disease deaths in Minnesota